Tao Nan School (abbreviation: TNS;), is a co-educational primary school in Singapore. One of the six Singapore Hokkien Huay Kuan schools, along with Ai Tong School, Chongfu Primary School, Kong Hwa School, Nan Chiau Primary School and Nan Chiau High School, Tao Nan School is among the 30 most popular primary schools listed by the Ministry of Education.

Tao Nan School is also offering the Gifted Education Programme that started in 1996. In 2007, it also started the Bi-Cultural Chinese Elective Programme (BiCEP) to develop effective bilingualism in its students. Tao Nan celebrated its 100th anniversary in 2006 with a carnival held on November 4. To provide better infrastructure to support the teaching and learning of its students, Tao Nan School underwent the PERI Upgrading from 2014 to 2015 and operated at the holding site in Bedok South Road. With the completion of the Upgrading Exercise, it returned to Marine Parade in 2016.

School crest
The school crest consists of a leaping lion and an open book on a blue shield. The lion represents the Lion City, which is Singapore. Its leaping position symbolises bravery and continuous progress and advancement in the face of difficulties. The open book represents the unquenchable thirst for knowledge. At the base of the crest is the school's motto: "Sincerity and Perseverance". The entire crest signifies the acquisition of abundant knowledge and the training of the strong and healthy body.

History

The Hokkien Clan Association (otherwise known as the Hokkien Huay Kuan) started Tao Nan School on 18 November 1906. It was one of the six modern Chinese schools in Singapore with a curriculum influenced by the educational reforms in China at the end of the 19th century.  The school was initially named Tao Nan Study Hall (道南學堂, Taonan hsüeht'ang). Taonan hsüeht'ang (道南學堂) can be translated as "spreading our philosophy, our culture and ideas to the South".

Classes were first held at the residence of Tan Kim Ching on North Bridge Road. With support from the Hokkien community, a purpose-built school was constructed. Benefactors include Tan Boon Liat, Lee Cheng Yan, Low Kim Pong, Tan Kah Kee, and Oei Tiong Ham, Majoor der Chinezen, the sugar magnate from Semarang, Central Java, whose donation largely financed the purchase of land on Armenian Street. Although it was originally set up to serve the Hokkien community and the lessons were held in Hokkien, it became the first Chinese school to accept speakers of other Chinese dialects.

The move to Armenian Street coincided with the 1911 overthrow of the Qing dynasty. Tao Nan became the first Chinese school to change the medium of instruction from the Hokkien dialect to Mandarin. One of the teachers was the philanthropist Lee Kong Chian (1894–1967). Pioneer artist Pan Shou was the headmaster from 1932 to 1940.

In 1982, Tao Nan School moved to a new campus in Marine Parade, where it still remains to this date. It was named a SAP (Special Assistance Plan) school in 1990 and a Gifted Education Programme Centre in 1996. In 2014, it moved to a temporary campus in Bedok South, while the Marine Parade campus underwent PERI Upgrading. It moved back into the Marine Parade campus in 2016. With 110 years of history it is one of Singapore's oldest primary schools.

Culture

Uniform
Boys wear white shirts and light blue shorts. Girls wear white blouses and light blue pinafores. Both uniforms have the school crest emblazoned on the left. While school shoes and socks can be purchased, any white-based shoes or ankle socks are allowed.

For days with PE lessons, students wear a white shirt with dark blue shorts to school. This uniform may be worn throughout the day on those days. The previous shirt had the image of the mascot of the house (Dolphin, Killer Whale, Marlin or Shark) that the student belonged to on the back. The new shirt has the words "道南学校 Tao Nan School", along with the school crest on the back. The school initials (TNS) are sewn on the shorts. House T-shirts are the same as the normal shirts, except that they have a picture of the house animal on the back instead of the school initials.

Prefects wear a blue Velcro tie, a name tag with their name, and a junior prefect or prefect badge above the school crest. The number of white lines printed on the tie determines the prefect's status: the Head Prefect has three stripes, the Vice-Head Prefect and other members of the Executive Committee have two, and the others have either one or no stripes.

The old junior prefect badge has the words 'junior prefect' engraved on them. The prefect badge has the school crest and 'prefect' written in gold on a black background together with the Prefect's name. The frame of the badge is gold.

A prefect T-shirt has been introduced. It is white with a blue high collar, with the word prefect on the left side of the T-shirt and on the back. Prefect in Mandarin (学长) is printed in blue on the left sleeve of the T-shirt. The prefects wear this shirt with their PE shorts on events during which they have prefect duties, such as Pesta Sukan or Swimming Carnival.

Sports' Day
Every year, there is a sports day event held by the Singapore Hokkien Huay Kuan. All members, (i.e. Ai Tong School, Kong Hwa School, Chongfu Primary School, Nan Chiau Primary School) and Tao Nan itself.

Co-curricular activities 
Tao Nan has numerous Co-curricular activities ranging from uniform groups like Brownies and Scouts to cultural groups like Chinese Dance and Chinese Orchestra.

Sports & Games
 Wushu
 Track and Field
 Badminton
 Swimming
 Netball
 Basketball
 Sailing
 Sports & Wellness

Clubs & Societies
 International Chess Club
 Art Club
 E2K Maths Club

 Advanced Mathematics Enrichment Club (AMEC)
 Science Club
 Infocomm Club
 Chinese Drama
 Media Resource Library
 Comics Club
 Chinese Club
 E2K Science Club

Uniformed Groups
 Scouts
 Brownies
 Girls' Brigade
 Boys' Brigade

Cultural Groups
 Guzheng
 Chinese Dance
 Chinese Orchestra
 Choir

Notable alumni
 Lee Kong Chian, Founder of Lee Rubber and Lee Foundation, Singapore's largest private charitable foundation
 Yeo Cheow Tong, Cabinet Minister (1990 - 2006), Member of Parliament
 Eleanor Lee, Singaporean actress and singer currently based in China

See also
Old Tao Nan School

Official Website

References

Primary schools in Singapore
Singapore Hokkien Huay Kuan schools
Educational institutions established in 1906
Marine Parade
1906 establishments in British Malaya